Mormon Reservoir is a reservoir on McKinney Creek in Camas County, Idaho. The reservoir is surrounded by private, state, and Bureau of Land Management land, which offers opportunities for boating, fishing, camping, and hunting, among other activities. The reservoir is impounded by Mormon Dam, which was built in 1908.

References

Lakes of Camas County, Idaho
Reservoirs in Idaho